The Blumau Formation is a geologic formation in Austria. It preserves fossils dated to the Silurian period.

See also

 List of fossiliferous stratigraphic units in Austria

References
 

Geologic formations of Austria
Silurian System of Europe
Silurian Austria
Silurian southern paleotropical deposits